The Southern Kings were a South African franchise that participated in Super Rugby in 2013, 2016 and 2017 and in the Pro14 from 2017–18 until the teams disbandment in 2020.

Below is a listing of all players that represented the Southern Kings.

Pro14 players

The following 99 players represented the Southern Kings in the Pro14 competition between 2017–18 and 2020:

Super Rugby players

The following 106 players represented the Southern Kings at Super Rugby level in 2013, 2016 and 2017:

Other players

2013 Super Rugby play-offs

The following players represented the Southern Kings in the 2013 relegation play-offs. These matches were official first class matches according to the South African Rugby Union, but not included by SANZAAR in official Super Rugby appearances statistics.

2009 Lions tour and 2011 IRB Nations Cup

The players that represented them in these fixtures were:

See also

 Southern Kings
 Super Rugby
 Pro14

References

External links
 Official website

 
Southern Kings Players
Southern Kings